Ganapati Hegde toti is the most famous in yakshagana,he had 27 years of experience in yakshagana , he achieved the "yaksha samrata " position in yakshagana 
 His dance is a beautiful performance, very emotional and moving, in his face we can see the exact emotions of the role,

Background Singers or Bhagawataru

Tenkutittu

Ira Gopalakrishna Bhagavatha, Aduru Anni Bhagavataru, Balipa Narayana Bhagavatha, Puttige Raghurama Holla, Puttige Ramakrishna Jois, Damodara Mandechcha, Nalluru Mariyappa Achar, Agari Srinivasa Bhagavatha, Agari Raghurama Bhagavatha, Kadathoka Manjunatha Bhagavatha, Padyana Ganapathi Bhat, Padyana Govinda Bhatt, Shiribagilu Ramakrishna Mayya, Tenkabail Thirumaleshwara Shastry, Kuriya Ganapathi Shastry, Maindappa Rai, Dinesh Ammannaya, Polya Laxminarayana Shetty, Balipa Prasada Bhagavatha, Balipa Gopalakrishna Bhagavatha, Balipa Shivashankara Bhagavatha, Kubanuru Sridhara Rao, Hosamoole Ganesha Bhat, Smt. Leelavathi Baipadithaya (The First lady singer in Yakshagana [Tenkutittu]), Bottikere Purushothama Poonja, Andala Deviprasad Shetty, Ravichandra Kannadikatte, Praphullachandra Nelyadi, Pattla Satish Shetty, Sathyanaryana Punichittaya, Bondel Satish Shetty, Shrinivas ballamanja, Ramesh Bhat Putturu, Prithviraj Kavattar, Subraya Sampaje and οthers. Bhavyashree Kulkunda, Kavyashree Nayak, Amrutha Adiga are some well known lady singers in Tenku School of Yakshagana. Herenjalu Gopal ganiga is one of the famous yakshagana singer.

Badagutittu
Balehadda Krishna Bhagavata 
Gorpadi Gopal Patil
Neelavara Ramakrishnayya
Nelavara Lakshminarayanayy
Kadatoka Manjunath Bhagavata, Kadatoka Krishna Bhagavata,
Kadatoka Lakshminarayana Bhagavata
Hosthota Manjunath Bhat(Bhagavata), Hostota Gajanana Bhat(Bhagavata)(Famous yakshagana poeter's(Hostota Brother's) also), Naranappa Uppoor GR Kalinga Navada, Subramanya Dhareshwara, Nebbooru Narayana Hegde, Airody Govindappa, Shankar Balkudru, Marvante Narasimha Das, Marvante Srinivas Das, Kolagi Keshava Hegde, K P Hegade Golagodu, Heranjal Gopala Ganiga, Ganapati Bhagwat Kavale, Raghavendra Maiyya, Nagara Subramanya Acharya, H Suresh Shetty, Vidhwan Ganapathi Bhat Mottegadde, Gopalkrishna Bhat Jogimane, Nelluru Narayana Achar,  Kolagi Madhava Bhat, Narayana Shabaraya, Jansale Raghavendra Acharya, K J Ganesh, A T Yajneshwara Ambaragodlu, M P Hegde Ullalagadde,Vishweshwara Somayaji, Marvi Vadiraja Hebbar, Sarveshvar Hegde Murooru, Shankar Bhat Brahmooru, Ramkrishna Hegde Hilluru, Prasanna Bhat Bhalkala, Kappekere Subraya Bhagavat, Parameshwar Hegde Ainabail,Balehadda Timmappa Hegde, Anantha Padmanabha Phatak, Anant Hegde Dantalike, Raveendra Bhat Achave, Anand Ankola. Nagara Subramanya Achar,Shivashankar Bhat Matvane, Sadashiva Amin Kokkarne,, Herenjalu Pallava Ganiga,Vighneshwar Kuntemane,Ellare Shankar Nayaka,

Background instrumentalists

Badagutittu
Maddale: Durgappa Gudigar, Hunchadakatte Srinivas Acharya, Karki Prabhakara Bhandary, Kavale Ganapati Bhagwat, Shankara Bhagawath Yellapura, Parameshwara Bhandary, Hiriyadka Gopala Rao,Balehadda Krishna Bhagavata,N G HEGDE Yallapura,Ramanna Hulimane, Manjunath Guddedimba, Hostota Gajanana Bhagavata,Sunil Bhandary, Shankar Bhagavata Yellapura, Kinner Narayan Hegde, Ananta  Padmanabha Phatak, K J Sudheendra, Raghavendra Hegde Yellapura, Narasimha Hegde Handramane, Sudhakara Heggodu
Chande: Hostota Gajanana Bhagavata Ramkrishna Mandarti, Shri Krishna Yaji Idagunji, Kota Shivananda, K J Krishna, Rakesh Malya, Janardhana Acharya Hallady,  Ganesh Bhat Honnekudige,,Srujan Haladi,Prasann Heggar

Tenkutittu
Kudrekudlu Ram Bhat, Adur Shva Madlegar, Nidle Narasimha Bhat, Divana Bhim Bhat, Adur Krishna, Kasaragod Venkataramana, Chipparu Krishnayya Ballal, Bandedka Sunder Rao, Harinarayan Bippadithayaru, Kadaba Narayana Acharya, Chandrashekhara Acharya Guruvayanakere, Mambady Subrahmanya Bhat, divana Shankara Bhat, Padyana Shankaranarayana Bhat, Padyana Jayaram Bhat, Padmanabha Upadhyaya, Delanthamajalu Subrahmanya Bhat, Murari Kadambalitthaya, Adur Ganesh Rao, Subrahmanya Shastri, Kadaba Vinaya Acharya, Chandrashekhara Acharya Guruvayanakere, Chaithanya Krishna Padyana, Mayur Naiga, Subrahmanya Chitrapura and οthers. Many young female artists like Apoorva Surathakal, Divyashree Nayak are also emerging.

Dancers

Badagutittu

Actor Joshi Gokarna, Keremane Shivarama Hegde, Chittani Ramachandra Hegde, Vandaru Basava, Keremane Mahabala Hegde, Keremane Shambhu Hegde, Kodadakuli Ramachandra Hegde, Gode Narayan Hegde, Kumta Govinda Naik, Mantap prabhakar Upadhya, Jalavalli Venkatesh Rao, Balkuru Krishna Yaji, Shankaranarayana Samaga, Jayrama Shetty Hallady, Keremane Shivanand Hegde, H. Kusta Ganiga, Veerabhadra Nayak, Govind Naik Konalli, Mohan Naik Kujalli, Srinivasa Nayak Sakkattu Lakshminarayana Mahadev Hegde Kappekere, Anant Hegde Kolagi, Bhaskar Joshi Shiralagi, Rama Nairy Brahmavara, Thandimane Shripad Bhat, Airody Govindappa, Gopal Achari Thirthahalli, Vidyadhar Rao Jalavalli, Ganapathi Naik Kumta, Shankar Hegde Nilkod, Kolali Krishna Shetty, Prakash Kiradi, Totimane Ganapathi Hegde. Beleyuru Sanjaya, Yelaguppa Subrahmanya Hegde, Nagara Jagannatha Shetty, Ramesha Bhandari

Thenkutittu

Delampuri Krishna Bhat, D. Manohar Kumar, Kuriya Vithala Shastry, Sheni Gopalakrishna Bhat, Soorikumeru Govinda Bhat, Alike Ramayya Rai, Puttur Sridhara 
Bhandari, Puttur Narayana Hegde, Madhur Ganapathy Rao, Ujre Ishwara Bhat, Bannada Malinga, Padre Chandu, Chandragiri Ambu, Kolyur Ramachandra Rao, Pathala Venkataramana Bhat, Kumble Sundara Rao,
Siddakatte Chennappa Shetty, Gerukatte Gangayya Shetty, D. Gopalakrishna Bhat, Narayana Shetty, Permude jayaprakash Shetty, Pundarikaksha Uoadhyaya, Sunnambala Vishweshwara Bhat, Shivarama Jogi, Sampaaje Sheenappa Rai, M K Ramesh Acharya, Tharanatha Vorkady, Bheem bhat ummettuguli, Kasaragod Subraya holla, Jagadhabhirama Padubidre, Divakar Rai sampaje, Chandrashekhar Dharmasthala, Jayananda sampaje, Vishnu Sharma Vatepadpu, Ganesha Arala, Ganesh Shetty Kannadikatte, Ganesha Chandramandala, Laxman Marakada, Manjunatha Bhat Bellare, Laxmana Kotiyan, Raviraja Paneyala, Ravi Mundaje,Venkatesh Kallugundi, Sadashiva Shetty Mundaje, Mohan Ammunje, Mohan Bellipady, Santhosh Kumar Manya, Radhakrishna Navada, Kodi Krishna Ganiga, Thodikana Vishwanatha Gowda, Umesh Hebbar, Ganesh Bhat Haluvalli, Ramesh Bhat Bayaru, Ajaar Umesh Shetty, Babu Kulal, Lakshmana Kallugudde, Sanjeeva Balegara, Srinivasa Kuriyala, Sandeep Koliyoor, Bolanturu Jayarama Shetty, Prashanth Shetty Nelyadi, Manohar Rai Bellare, Nidle Govinda Bhat, Ramadasa Samaga, Akshay Kumar Marnad, Janardhana Jogi, Umamaheshwara Sharma,Batwala Jayarama Acharya,Santhosh Kumar Hiliyana,Rakshit Sheety Padre,Deepak Rao Pejavara,

References

Yakshagana